Tashtuy (Taştuy) is a rural locality (a village) in Yangilsky Selsoviet, Abzelilovsky District, Bashkortostan, Russia. The population was 491 as of 2010. There are 10 streets.

Geography 
Tashtuy is located 25 km east of Askarovo (the district's administrative centre) by road. Yangi-Aul is the nearest rural locality.

References 

Rural localities in Abzelilovsky District